Robyn Denise Broughton  (née Quirk) is a New Zealand netball coach. Broughton coached the Southern Sting from 1998 to 2007 during the National Bank Cup, winning seven titles in ten years. She was also an assistant coach for the New Zealand national netball team from 2000 to 2002, and is currently a national selector. From 2012 to 2015, Broughton coached the Central Pulse in the ANZ Championship, after four years with the Southern Steel and later coached the Hertfordshire Mavericks in the Netball Superleague.

Domestic netball
The National Bank Cup (NBC) started in 1998 as New Zealand's first franchise-based netball competition. Broughton was appointed head coach of the Invercargill-based Southern Sting, and remained with the franchise throughout the competition's ten-year run. During her time with the Sting, Broughton took the team to the grand final every year, winning seven titles.

With the start of the ANZ Championship, Broughton was appointed head coach of the Southern Steel, a merger franchise between the Southern Sting and Otago Rebels. She remained in the role from 2008 to 2011. The Steel franchise board readvertised the role for the head coaching position following a troubled 2011 season. Broughton chose not to reapply, and was later signed by troubled Wellington franchise the Central Pulse for their 2012 campaign.

World Seven
Broughton also coached a touring World 7 side (retired or former international players from New Zealand, with current players from England, Jamaica and Samoa) against the Australia national netball team netball team in a one-off test in Adelaide on 2 September 2009, after three tests against the Silver Ferns. The team was not expected to win but Broughton and her side picked up one of the biggest results in international netball with a 52–43 win. The World 7 side included players such as Donna Wilkins (her Southern Steel shooter), along with English international defenders Geva Mentor and Sonia Mkoloma. New Zealand Silver Fern squad member and Steel midcourter Wendy Telfer, Northern Mystics' Debbie White and New Zealand–based Samoans Frances Solia and Catherine Latu were also part of the side.

Fastnet Ferns 
In 2010, Broughton was asked to head a new project and take over as coach of the FastNet Ferns team, who play at the annual World FastNet Series. Silver Ferns coach Ruth Aitken stepped down from the position after the inaugural 2009 tournament. Netball New Zealand told Broughton in September that the side would be filled with developing players, an approach also adopted by the Australian FastNet Diamonds.
 
At the 2010 World Netball Series, the FastNet Ferns struggled during their round robin matches, going down to Australia in their opening match, losing by two goals to England and scraping a draw against Jamaica. Nevertheless, the Ferns still managed to qualify for the finals. New Zealand went on to battle Jamaica in a tight, physical semi-final, with the Ferns upsetting the Sunshine Girls to move to the final. England dispatched Australia in the other semi. The FastNet Ferns defeated England in the 2010 final, retaining the FastNet Series title. 

Broughton was commended in her role as head coach, leading basically a New Zealand development side to victory over much stronger English and Jamaican teams.

Honours
Broughton was appointed a Member of the New Zealand Order of Merit for services to netball and the community in the 2004 New Year Honours. In the 2012 Queen's Birthday and Diamond Jubilee Honours, she was promoted to Officer of the New Zealand Order of Merit, for services to netball.

References

Year of birth missing (living people)
Living people
New Zealand netball coaches
Officers of the New Zealand Order of Merit
Netball Superleague coaches
ANZ Championship coaches
New Zealand expatriate netball people in England
Southern Steel coaches
Central Pulse coaches
National Bank Cup coaches